Arthur Llewellyn Basham (24 May 1914 – 27 January 1986) was a noted historian, Indologist and author of a number of books. As a Professor at the School of Oriental and African Studies, London in the 1950s and the 1960s, he taught a number of famous historians of India, including professors Ram Sharan Sharma, Romila Thapar, and V. S. Pathak and Thomas R. Trautmann.

Early life
Arthur Llewellyn Basham was born on 24 May 1914, in Loughton, Essex, the son of Abraham Arthur Edward Basham and Maria Jane Basham née Thompson. Although an only child, he grew up in Essex with his adopted sister, who was in fact his cousin on his father's side. His father had been a journalist who served in the Indian Army at Kasauli, near Simla during World War I, and it was the stories that his father told him about India that first introduced him to the culture of the country to which he would devote his professional career. His mother was also a journalist and short story writer further instilling a love of language and literature. As a child, he was also introduced to music and learnt to play the piano to a high standard, writing a number of his own compositions by the age of sixteen.

As an undergrad at ANU in the 1970s I well remember attending his Asian Civilizations lectures in the HC Coombs lecture theatre. One morning in 1974 we noticed that an upright piano had been left from a performance the previous evening. Upon arrival for his lecture, Prof Basham calmly strolled over to the piano, sat down and played the most beautiful Chopin for five minutes or so. A standing ovation from his students followed. I can still see him striding across the campus, pipe-in-mouth, forty years later.

Basham developed a keen interest in religion which began with the Christianity he was brought up with and then extended into Hinduism, Buddhism and Islam. He went on to take a BA in Sanskrit from the School of Oriental and African Studies ("SOAS") and then worked in the Civil Defence Department during World War II.

Career

After the war he returned to SOAS and began researching for a PhD under Professor L.D. Barnett. For his research into the "History and Doctrines of the Ajivikas" he received a scholarship. He became a lecturer in 1948, attained the PhD in 1950, became a Reader in 1954, and in 1958 was promoted to Professorship. When the Head of the Department of History, Professor C. H. Philips, was promoted to the Directorship of SOAS, Professor Basham became the Head of History, a position he kept until 1965 when he joined the Australian National University ("ANU") in Canberra as Head of the History Department and Professor of Oriental (later Asian) Civilizations.

After retiring from ANU in 1979, Basham accepted a series of one year visiting professorships with various universities. Basham was one of the first western historians to critically gauge the impact of Swami Vivekananda from a global perspective. His well-known comment about Vivekananda that "in centuries to come, he will be remembered as one of the main moulders of the modern world," is quoted frequently in appreciations and tributes of Vivekananda. Basham was appointed Swami Vivekananda Professor in Oriental Studies at the Asiatic Society of Calcutta in September 1985. He died in Calcutta in India in 1986. An annual public lecture series is given at the ANU in his memory.

Books
Possibly his most popular book is The Wonder That was India (Sidgwick & Jackson, London, 1954) – published seven years after the 1947 Independence of India. Revised editions of the book were released in 1963 and then 1967. Rupa & Co, New Delhi brought out a paperback edition in 1981. Macmillan Publishers Ltd., London, brought out a paperback edition in 1985. By 2001, the paperback version was in its 37th edition. Amazon.com staff review/book description reads "most widely used introduction to Indian civilization. Although first published in 1954, it has remained a classic interpretation." In the book he states that "man can escape from 'Law of Gravity' as well as 'passage of Time' but not from his deeds".

Basham also wrote History and Doctrines of the Ajivikas, based on his PhD work done under L. D. Barnett. Several of his key papers on Hinduism were edited as the book The Origins and Development of Classical Hinduism by Kenneth G. Zysk. A book about Basham, written by Sachindra Kumar Maity (published 1997, Abhinav Publications) is entitled Professor A.L. Basham, My Guruji and Problems and Perspectives of Ancient Indian History and Culture. the book includes 80 of Basham's letters addressed to the author. Thomas R. Trautmann a professor for history and anthropology at the University of Michigan, dedicated his book Aryans and British India (1997, University of California Press) 'In memory of A. L. Basham, British Sanskritist historian of India, guru, friend'.

Bibliography
Books
 The History and Doctrines of the Ajivikas: a Vanished Indian Religion, London, 1951, 
 The Wonder that was India, London, 1954, 
 Papers on the Date of Kaniṣka, Leiden, 1968, 
 A Cultural History of India (editor), Oxford, 1975, 

He also revised Vincent Arthur Smith's Oxford History of India with Mortimer Wheeler in 1958.

Papers
 
 
 
 
 Basham, A. L. (1981) "The Evolution of the Concept of Bodhisattva" in The Bodhisattva Doctrine in Buddhism, Edited by Kawamura, Leslie S., Waterloo, Ont: Published for the Canadian Corporation for Studies in Religion/Corporation canadienne des sciences religieuses by Wilfrid Laurier University Press, 1981. ("Papers presented at the Calgary Buddhism conference, Sept. 18–21, 1978, sponsored by the Religious Studies Dept., Faculty of Humanities, University of Calgary"),

References

External links 

 Basham lectures at the Australian National University

1914 births
1986 deaths
People from Loughton
Academics of SOAS University of London
English Indologists
Historians of South Asia
20th-century Indian historians
English historians
20th-century Australian historians
Academic staff of the Australian National University
Scholars from Kolkata
People associated with Shillong